Markus Ryffel (born 5 February 1955 in Bern) is a former long-distance runner from Switzerland who won the silver medal in the 5000 metres at the 1984 Summer Olympics in Los Angeles.

Biography
He set the Swiss record at 13:07.54 min. He also won a silver medal at the 1978 European Championships in Athletics, sharing it with the Soviet Union's Alexander Fedotkin;  they both lost just one-tenth of a second to Italy's Venanzio Ortis.
Between these two major championships medals, Ryffel had a rather varying success as a 5,000-metre runner.  In the 1980 Moscow Olympics, he placed fifth in that distance, losing to the winner, Ethiopia's Miruts Yifter, by 2.1 seconds. He ran significantly worse in the 1982 European Athletics Championships in Athens and in the 1983 World Athletics Championships in Helsinki, Finland, placing only tenth and twelfth, respectively.  
Ryffel's final few years as a competitive runner, after the Los Angeles Olympics, were also rather undistinguished.  He placed third in a time of slightly over 14 minutes at 5,000 metres in the European Athletics Cup's B final in Budapest in 1985. In the 1986 European Athletics Championships, he dropped out of the 5,000-metre final. In his last major international championships, the 1987 World Athletics Championships, he placed well outside the top ten runners at 10,000 metres and was eliminated in the 5,000-metre qualifying heats.

Personal Bests
1500m: 3:38.60
Mile: 3:58.05
2000m: 4:59.54
3000m: 7:41.00
5000m: 13:07.54
10000m: 27:54.29

References

External links
 
 
 

1955 births
Living people
Swiss male long-distance runners
Athletes (track and field) at the 1976 Summer Olympics
Athletes (track and field) at the 1980 Summer Olympics
Athletes (track and field) at the 1984 Summer Olympics
Olympic athletes of Switzerland
Olympic silver medalists for Switzerland
European Athletics Championships medalists
Sportspeople from Bern
Medalists at the 1984 Summer Olympics
Olympic silver medalists in athletics (track and field)